Hamilton Musical Theatre is an amateur musical theatre organisation based in Hamilton, New Zealand. It was formerly known as Musikmakers.

Brief history
Musikmakers was registered as an Incorporated Society in 1978, but the society did not find a permanent home until the council purchased the building which had been home to the Orange Garden Cabaret on Riverlea Rd. In 1984, Musikmakers was part of a cooperative venture between Playbox, the Theatre Technique Trust and the Waikato Society of Potters to establish the Riverlea Theatre and Arts Centre. 

The society performed musical theatre under the Musikmakers name until April 2021, when the  society was re-incorporated as the Hamilton Musical Theatre. The first performance given under the new name was A Funny Thing Happened on the Way to the Forum, with music by Stephen Sondheim, in May 2021. This was the first major production since the easing of restrictions because of the COVID-19 pandemic.

Examples of shows staged
 A Funny Thing Happened on the Way to the Forum
 All Shook Up
 Chicago
 Fiddler on the Roof
 Godspell
 Grease
 Les Misérables
 Oklahoma!
 Oliver!
 The King and I
 The Producers
 Seven Brides for Seven Brothers
 Show Boat
 South Pacific

References

External links
 Hamilton Musical Theatre official website
 Riverlea Theatre official website

Theatre companies in New Zealand
Companies based in Hamilton, New Zealand
1984 establishments in New Zealand